Agrioglypta zelimalis is a moth in the family Crambidae described by Francis Walker in 1859. It is found in India, Sri Lanka, Indonesia (Sumatra, Borneo), New Caledonia and Australia, where it has been recorded in Queensland.

The wingspan is 24–26 mm. The forewings are shining white with brownish lines. The hindwings are shining white.

References

Moths described in 1859
Spilomelinae
Moths of Asia
Moths of Australia